The Persecutor, also known as Forgive Me Natasha and less commonly as Sergei, is the autobiography of Sergei Kourdakov, a former KGB agent who persecuted Christians in the Soviet Union in the 1970s, but defected to Canada in 1971 and converted to Evangelical Christianity. The book was finished shortly before his death in January 1973 and published posthumously.

It was published in English, then translated to at least fourteen languages including German, Spanish, French, Russian, and Dutch. Although the English versions have since ceased publication, various foreign-language versions are still in print.

Background
The Persecutor details Sergei Kourdakov's early life in Novosibirsk Oblast, his life as an orphan, the raids he led on private Christian assemblies while a Naval academy student in Petropavlovsk-Kamchatsky, his defection to Canada, and his new life in Canada and the United States. The book opens with Kourdakov's escape to Canada. Beginning with the second chapter, the book flashes back to Kourdakov's childhood.

Criticism
The Persecutor has been met with varied criticism regarding its authorship and accuracy. Some, such as Albert W. Wardin, believe that the biography was at least partially written by members of Underground Evangelism, the Christian organization which Kourdakov was a member of that helped smuggle Bibles into communist countries. Wardin also claims that the book gives a distorted view of evangelical life in the Soviet Union, stating that "the allegation that for years before the late 1960s there was not even one Protestant church in Novosibirsk is untrue" and that "the figure of 30,000 Initiative Baptists in Kamthatka [...] and that of over 150 attacks in two years seems unbelievably high."

In 2004, United States Christian journalist Caroline Walker released a drama documentary about The Persecutor. Claiming to have been given a vision from God, she traveled to Siberia to investigate various parts of book. Through the film, she claims that contrary to her own expectations, there are many inconsistencies in the autobiography, such as the section dealing with Sergei's experience in the Barysevo Orphanage as a child. The documentary, titled Forgive Me, Sergei (a pun on the autobiography title), was co-produced and directed by 
Polish Jesuit Damian Wojciechowski, whom she met during her investigation. He was also attempting to film a documentary on Kourdakov's life, but was struggling with inconsistencies in the book.

The documentary received multiple awards at film festivals.

See also
 Persecution of Christians in the Soviet Union
 List of works published posthumously

Notes and references

1973 non-fiction books
Religious autobiographies
Books published posthumously